The Borough of Dún Laoghaire was a borough on the southern coast of County Dublin, Ireland from 1930 to 1994. Its local authority was the Corporation of Dún Laoghaire. 

The borough was formed under the Local Government (Dublin) Act 1930 from the urban districts of Blackrock, Dalkey, Dún Laoghaire, and Killiney and Ballybrack. Plans to merge these coastal authorities were first made in 1903, a bill to effect this was being drawn up in 1924.

Whereas most Irish boroughs had the limited autonomy of an urban district, Dún Laoghaire had greater powers and was for many purposes practically a county borough independent of Dublin County Council.

The corporation headquarters was in Dún Laoghaire Town Hall. Dún Laoghaire was one of seven (non-county) boroughs and urban districts with its own Vocational Education Committee (VEC).

On 1 January 1994, under the Local Government (Dublin) Act 1993, County Dublin ceased to exist, and was succeeded by three new counties: Fingal, Dún Laoghaire–Rathdown and South Dublin. Under the same provisions, the borough of Dún Laoghaire also ceased to exist. The powers of the Corporation of Dún Laoghaire were transferred to the new Dún Laoghaire–Rathdown County Council. Whereas the VECs of other boroughs and urban districts were absorbed by the surrounding county's VEC in 1997, Dún Laoghaire VEC remained in existence until VECs were abolished in 2013, whereupon its functions were transferred to Dublin and Dún Laoghaire Education and Training Board.

References

External links
Dun Laoghaire Borough History Society
Dublin Historic Maps: Dublin Townships and Urban Districts, between 1847 and 1930
Dún Laoghaire Vocational Education Committee

Dún Laoghaire
Former local authorities in the Republic of Ireland
Local government in County Dublin
Politics of Dún Laoghaire–Rathdown
Dún L